The Anclote River, running for  near Tarpon Springs, Florida flows westward towards the Gulf of Mexico from its source of creeks and springs inland.  The river is home to a variety of fish and wildlife.  Anclote River is home to the sponging and fishing industries of Tarpon Springs (including a large shrimp industry).  It is a major site for tourists of the area as it flows through the spongedocks of Tarpon Springs.

An extension of the Pinellas Trail which crosses the Anclote River was dedicated on June 15, 2004.  The new extension is built along abandoned Atlantic Coast Line railroad grade, which once serviced industry on the north side of the river.

List of crossings

Anclote River Park

The Anclote River Park boasts of a 300-foot sandy beach facing the sandbars of the Anclote River. The park has designated areas for swimming, boating and fishing. It is operational dawn to dusk, all 7 days of the week. The back of the beach zone is dotted with big oak trees. There are also changing rooms, bathrooms and outdoor showers nearby. The beach is ideal for families, toddlers and even older couples. Alcohol is not allowed and parking charges apply.

Things To Do

Boating

The park boasts of a six-lane boat ramp that's ideal for boaters. For boat storage and rentals, Anclote Village Marina is right next doors.

Fishing

Except for boat ramp and beach area, fishing can be done anywhere around the park. Mullets and crabs are easily found in the channels that are shallow.

Picnics and Parties

The place is great for hosting small birthday parties or small barbeques. There are giant covered pavilions, picnic benches, children's playground, charcoal barbeque grills, horseshoe field, and a volleyball court to keep everyone busy.

References 

General references
FDOT Florida Bridge Data 01-05-2010

Rivers of Florida
Geography of the Tampa Bay area
Bodies of water of Pasco County, Florida
Bodies of water of Pinellas County, Florida